After Robots is the first full-length album by the South African indie rock band BLK JKS. It was released on September 8, 2009 on the Secretly Canadian label.

Critical reception

According to Metacritic, based on 21 critic reviews, After Robots has a score of 75 out of 100, indicating "generally favorable reviews." For example, Gideon Brody of Drowned in Sound gave it a rating of 8 out of 10 and concluded, "When it's at its best, After Robots harbours a brave sense of adventurism, a fearless experimentalism."

Track listing

Personnel
Lindani Buthelezi-	Guitar, Vocals
Molefi Makananise-	Bass, Vocals
Mpumi Mcata-	Guitar (Rhythm), Lead Vocals
Tshepang Ramoba-	Drums, Vocals
Hypnotic Brass Ensemble-	Brass
Mike Kapinus	- Trumpet
Mike Pallman-	 Saxophone
Mike Bridavsky-	Engineer
Brandon Curtis-	Mixing, Producer
Andrew Dosunmu-	Photography
Joe Lambert-	Mastering
Mike Notaro-	Engineer
Geoff Sanoff-	Mixing

References

2009 debut albums
BLK JKS albums
Secretly Canadian albums